Ratnakumar is a 1949 Indian Tamil-language film starring P. U. Chinnappa and P. Bhanumathi. M. G. Ramachandran did a supporting role. The film was released on 15 December 1949.

Plot 
Despite his poverty, the protagonist Rathnakumar woos and wins the hand of Bhanumati.  At the bidding of the hero, a skeleton hurls a giant rock on the ground, and diamonds, rubies and emeralds pop out.  Falling into evil company, he becomes addicted to vices that make him ill-treat his wife and then desert her without any qualms.  He proceeds to fall for a beautiful princess and impresses her under false pretences.  However, he eventually receives his comeuppance as his dubious past is revealed and he is imprisoned. Thereupon his conscience awakes and he is filled with remorse at the thought of his patient wife. Rathnakumar is an ordinary man of shifting loyalties, greed, lust, deceit and ultimately penitence.

Cast 

Male cast
 P. U. Chinnappa as Rathnakumar
 M. G. Ramachandran as Balathevan
  Mahadevan
 D. Balasubramanyam
 N. S. Krishnan as Begger
 T. S. Durairaj
 K. Radhakrishnan as Kingdom's guard
 K. P. Kesavan
 T. P. Ponnusami Pillai
 C. S. Pandian

Female cast
 P. Bhanumathi as Malathi
 T. A. Mathuram as Nandini
 K. Malathi
 Parvathi

Soundtrack 
The music was composed by G. Ramanathan and C. R. Subbaraman. The lyrics were written by Papanasam Sivan and Surabhi. C. R. Subburaman made K. Malathi to sing a solo and a duet with PUC in this film. Although she is a talented singer, this is the only film in which she sang.

Reception 
The film did poorly at the box office.

References

External links 

1940s Tamil-language films
1949 films
Films directed by Krishnan–Panju
Films scored by G. Ramanathan
Films scored by C. R. Subbaraman
Indian black-and-white films
Indian epic films